Benazir may refer to a first name for a girl. Notable people with the name include:

 Benazir Bhutto (1953–2007), Pakistani politician
 Benazir Charles (born 1992), Dutch model and beauty queen
 Benazir Hussein (born 1972), British-Indian ballerina
 Benazir Salam (born 1979), Bangladeshi dancer
 Benazir Shaikh, actress in the Indian TV show Agadam Bagdam Tigdam
 Benazir, principal character in the 1964 Hindi film Benazir
 Benazir, courtesan and Visha Kanya in the Indian TV series Jodha Akbar

Pakistani feminine given names
Urdu feminine given names